Last Flight Home may refer to:

 Last Flight Home (album), 2020 album by Todd Sucherman
 Last Flight Home, 2022 documentary film about Eli Timoner